Bebelis picta is a species of beetle in the family Cerambycidae. It was described by Pascoe in 1875.

References

Bebelis
Beetles described in 1875